The Interaction Design Foundation (IxDF) is an educational organization which produces open access educational materials online with the stated goal of "democratizing education by making world-class educational materials free for anyone, anywhere." The platform also offers courses taught by industry experts and professors in user experience, psychology, user interface design, and more. 
 
While not accredited, the curriculum and content are structured at the graduate level, targeting at both industry and academia in the fields of interaction design, design thinking, user experience, information architecture, and user interface design.

The centerpieces of the Interaction-Design.org are their online design courses, their local chapters in more than 150 countries, and their peer reviewed Encyclopedia of Human-Computer Interaction, which currently holds 40+ textbooks written by 100+ leading designers and professors as well as commentaries and HD video interviews shot around the world. 
The platform features professional and academic textbooks, online courses, video lectures, local chapters in more than 150 countries, and a comprehensive bibliography of the most authoritative publications within the design of interactive technology.

In June 2013, the Interaction Design Foundation launched a 4 year 35,000 mile bike tour, named "Share the Knowledge Tour", to raise awareness of the rising cost of education - with weekly events on university campuses.

Financial sponsors include the German software company SAP. Authors include Harvard professor Clayton Christensen and New York Times bestselling author, Robert Spence  who invented the "magnifying glass" visualization that is familiar to anyone with an iPhone or iMac, and Stu Card  who performed the research that led to the computer mouse's commercial introduction by Xerox.

The Executive Board currently include Don Norman, Ken Friedman, Bill Buxton, Irene Au, Michael Arent, Daniel Rosenberg, Jonas Lowgren and Olof Schybergson.

See also
 Educational technology
 Educational websites
 Open content

References

External links 
 
 "MOOC pedagogy: the challenges"

Human–computer interaction
Design
Technical communication
Usability
Multimodal interaction